Krishna Nagar is a residential area in the city of Lucknow. It is located to the south of Sharda Canal and west of Kanpur Road. It has a police station which is under the control of the Lucknow Police.

Geography

Next to the Krishna Nagar metro station is a very large college called Lucknow Polytechnic, which is semi-governmental.

Krishna Nagar has various parks, like the traffic training park (Yaata Yaat Park), Shaakha (Bharat Maata Mandir Park), Indreshwar Mandir Park, Vishnu Lok Park, Technical Ground, and many others.

Krishna Nagar has many localities. The following are some of the prominent ones under Krishna Nagar Police Station supervision and Postal Division:

Ashutosh Nagar
Manas Nagar
Vijay Nagar
Hydel Colony
Sindhu Nagar
Gopal Nagar
Vinay Nagar
Ganesh Nagar
Inderlok Colony
Vishnu Lok
Pandit Kera
Jafar Khera
Bhola Khera

Transport
E-Rickshaws are available for public transport in the area. The residential area is served by Krishna Nagar Metro Station. The Lucknow International Airport is three kilometers from Krishna Nagar, the railway station is six, and the Alambagh Bus Station is four.

Schools
Schools in the area include:

Lucknow polytechnic
Lucknow Model Public Inter College
Adarsh Bharti Vidyalaya
Bhupati Singh Memorial Inter College
Awasiya Inter College
Dream India School
Mahanagar Public Inter College
Cambridge school
Bachpan, a play school
 Jaipuria school kanpur road campus

References

Neighbourhoods in Lucknow